Catalan Communications was a New York City publishing company that existed from 1983 to 1991 and was operated by Bernd Metz (1944–2012), which mainly focused on English-language translations of European graphic novels presented in a series of high-quality trade paperbacks, or rather comic albums, a European book format American comic book readers were at the time not accustomed to, neither for its physical dimensions nor for their at a mature readership aimed contents, and who at the time had the tendency to use the diminutive term "Euro-comics" to refer to the for them unfamiliar format. Metz became one of the very first American publishers who tried to introduce US readership to the European-style comics on a larger scale than the niche-market efforts undertaken by HM Communications – publisher of the groundbreaking Heavy Metal magazine – in the preceding decade.

History

The company was founded in April 1983 as a collaboration between Bernd Metz, Herb Spiers, and Josep Toutain (1930–1997) of Selecciones Ilustradas in Barcelona. It published from 1984 until 1992, operating out of a large loft located at 43 East 19th Street. Metz was the editor-in-chief, and the novelist Tom Leighton and later Elizabeth Bell provided English translations for the French and French-edition titles, including Max Cabanes' Colin-Maillard (Heartthrobs). Despite initial struggles, the company was able to quickly establish financial stability, in large part due to their printing being done in Europe, where it was more economical to produce small press runs.

On August 1, 1985, US Customs officials seized copies of Massimo Mattioli's Squeak the Mouse on grounds that they were obscene. Since all of Catalan's publications were adult-only material, and at least as susceptible to seizure as Squeak the Mouse, Metz chose to fight the obscenity charge in court. Metz won the case, and distributors actually increased their orders for Squeak the Mouse following the seizure, despite a coinciding price increase on the book. In 1990, the Cabanes graphic novel was the winner of the Grand Prix at France's Angoulême International Comics Festival. One of Bell's translated books for Catalan revealed errors in an earlier Heavy Metal translation of the same story. James Keller, the Germanic studies scholar, translated the German edition of Sacher-Masoch's Venus in Furs (Guido Crepax) in 1991, the year the company released its last titles. Tom Leighton was the IT arm of the firm as well as the translator from French until 1989. Jeff Lisle translated from Italian and Spanish.

Other books published by Catalan included Jacques Loustal's Love Shots, Lorenzo Mattotti's Fires, and Barcelona artist Marti Riera's The Cabbie, with an introduction by Art Spiegelman. Published in five languages, Trip to Tulum by Federico Fellini and Milo Manara, with essays translated by Elizabeth Bell, was selected by Publishers Weekly as one of the best trade paperbacks of 1990.

In 1989–90, Catalan expanded its line with the "ComCat" line of comic albums aimed at an all-age readership, such as Blake and Mortimer, The Adventures of Yoko, Vic and Paul, Code XIII and Young Blueberry, the type of European comics traditionally referred to by its French-derived "bande dessinées" qualifier.

Publications

Catalan titles

ComCat titles

References

Sources
 

Comic book publishing companies of the United States
Defunct comics and manga publishing companies